Cuspilongus is an extinct genus of parasitic wasp in the sawfly family Cephidae. At the time of its description the new genus comprised a single species named Cuspilongus cachecreekensis, known from an Eocene fossil found in North America. D. Kopylov and A. Rasnitsyn (2016) transferred "Mesocephus" ghilarovi, known from the Early Cretaceous of Mongolia, to the genus as Cuspilongus ghilarovi.

History and classification
C. cachecreekensis is known only from one fossil, a part and counterpart holotype, specimen number F-1545 & F-1546, which is housed in the collections of the Thompson Rivers University in Kamloops, British Columbia.  Cuspilongus was described from a specimen which was recovered from outcrops of the early Eocene, Ypresian McAbee Fossil Beds near Cache Creek, British Columbia.  The unnamed formation outcropping at the McAbee Fossil Beds preserve an upland temperate flora that was first interpreted as being Microthermal, although further study has shown them to be more mesothermal in nature.  The plant community preserved in the McAbee Fossil Beds site is mostly broadleaf pollen with alder and elm dominating, and may represent a successional forest involving multiple volcanic ash eruptions.

C. cachecreekensis was first studied by the paleoentomologists S. Bruce Archibald from Simon Fraser University in Burnaby, British Columbia and Alexandr Rasnitsyn of the A. A. Borissiak Paleontological Institute. Their 2015 type description of the new genus and species was published in the journal Canadian Entomologist. The genus name Cuspilongus was coined by the researchers as a combination of the Latin words cuspis which means "lance" and longus meaning long, in reference to the notable length of the holotype's ovipositor.

Cuspilongus cachecreekensis was one of three sawfly species described in Archibald & Rasnitsyn's 2015 paper, the other two being Ulteramus republicensis and Ypresiosirex orthosemos, from the Klondike Mountain Formation and the McAbee fossil beds respectively.

Description

C. cachecreekensis
The single described female of C. cachecreekensis is mostly complete, missing the legs entirely, with the antennae preserved in disarticulated segments, and portions of the abdomen are obscured. The head and thorax are dark in coloration, while the abdomen is light colored in the preserved and visible areas. Similarly the wings are lightly colored to hyaline, with the exception of the intercostal space, which is notably darkened. The genus is distinct from other members of the family in the length of the ovipositor, which is similar to the length of the forewing. Living members of the family have ovipositors that are only up to half the length of the forewing.

References

Ypresian insects
Fossils of British Columbia
Fossils of Mongolia
Fossil taxa described in 1988
Fossil taxa described in 2015
Cretaceous insects of Asia
Prehistoric insects of North America
Tranquille Formation
†